Jessica Samuelsson (born 14 March 1985) is a Swedish former heptathlete. She represented her country at the 2012 Summer Olympics as well as three World Championships. Her only major international medal came from the 2009 Summer Universiade where she won gold.

Achievements

References

1985 births
Swedish heptathletes
Athletes (track and field) at the 2012 Summer Olympics
Olympic athletes of Sweden
Universiade medalists in athletics (track and field)
Living people
Universiade gold medalists for Sweden
Medalists at the 2009 Summer Universiade